The 1996 New Mexico Lobos football team was an American football team that represented the University of New Mexico in the Western Athletic Conference (WAC) during the 1996 NCAA Division I-A football season.  In their fifth season under head coach Dennis Franchione, the Lobos compiled a 6–5 record (3–5 against WAC opponents) and outscored opponents by a total of 331 to 280. 

The team's statistical leaders included Donald Sellers with 2,048 passing yards, Lennox Gordon with 1,008 rushing yards, Jeremy Banks with 538 receiving yards, and kicker Colby Cason with 62 points scored.

Schedule

Roster

References

New Mexico
New Mexico Lobos football seasons
New Mexico Lobos football